Albany is a Legislative Assembly electorate in the state of Western Australia. Albany is named for the port and regional city of Western Australia which falls within its borders. It is one of the oldest electorates in Western Australia, with its first member having been elected in the inaugural 1890 elections of the Legislative Assembly. It is regarded as a swinging seat, and has been held by the Labor Party since the 2001 election, at which Peter Watson was first elected. Watson announced his retirement prior to the 2021 election and was succeeded in the seat by Labor Party colleague, Rebecca Stephens.

Geography
As at the 2015 redistribution, the electoral district of Albany contains the entirety of two local government areas: the City of Albany, and the Shire of Jerramungup.

At the 2007 redistribution, the electoral district of Albany had the same boundaries as the City of Albany, including Albany and its suburbs, the nearby towns of Elleker, Kalgan, Lower King, Torbay. This represented a significant expansion of its boundaries, in part due to the "one-vote one-value" electoral legislation which largely abolished malapportionment between country and metropolitan electorates in the Legislative Assembly. Prior to 2007, the electorate was largely limited to Albany and its suburbs—the additional sections were within the now abolished electorate of Stirling.

Members for Albany

Election results

References

External links
 Electorate profile (Antony Green, ABC)

Albany, Western Australia
Albany